Speed skating at the 2022 Winter Olympics was held at the National Speed Skating Oval ("Ice Ribbon") in Beijing, China between 5 and 19 February 2022. It was the 24th time speed skating was held at the Winter Olympics (17th time for women). 

A total of 166 quota spots (83 per gender) were distributed to the sport, a decline of 14 from the 2018 Winter Olympics. For the first time, gender equality was achieved in terms of quotas. A total of 14 events were contested, seven for men and seven for women.

Qualification

A total quota of 166 athletes was allowed to compete at the Games (maximum 83 men and 83 women). For the 2018 Winter Olympics the total quota was 180 athletes (maximum 100 men and 80 women). The maximum total number of athletes per gender per nation was 9, compared to 10 in 2018. Countries were assigned quotas based on the results of ISU Speed Skating World Cup competitions. When quota were reached, each nation was permitted to enter a maximum of three athletes per gender for all events apart from the 5000m (women), 10,000m (men) and mass start events, for which they could enter a maximum of two athletes per event.

Qualification times
The following qualification times were released on July 1, 2021, and were unchanged from 2018.

Competition schedule
The following was the competition schedule for all speed skating events. With the exception of the Team pursuit events, all rounds of each event were concluded within a single session.

All times are local times.

Medal summary

Medal table

Men's events

Women's events

Skaters who did not participate in the final of the team pursuit event, but received medals as part of the team, having taken part in an earlier round.

Participating nations
27 nations sent speed skaters to compete in the speed skating events.

Records

Olympic records

Controversy
In the men's 500 metres event, a false start was called in the last two heats, one of which included current World Cup champion Laurent Dubreuil. This was questioned by 1992 Winter Olympics Champion Bart Veldkamp.

References

External links
 Official Results Book – Speed skating

 
2022
Winter Olympics
Olympics, 2022
Speed skating